Lucas the Spider is an animated character created by animator Joshua Slice, named after and voiced by his nephew.  Lucas is based on a jumping spider and has starred in multiple short YouTube videos between 2017 and 2019. The first Lucas the Spider video was uploaded on November 5, 2017. Lucas was met with a highly positive reception for his gentle and warm-hearted nature.

In 2018, a plushie of Lucas the Spider was released for sale online. In May 2018, the series was acquired by Canadian production company Fresh TV. In December 2018, Lucas the Spider appeared in YouTube Rewind 2018.

2020 saw no new YouTube episodes. In various replies within posts to comments on his Instagram, Slice has stated that they "haven’t posted any new content for a while because the team is hard at work on the TV show!". A short upload on YouTube on July 29, 2021 announced then-upcoming episodes on the Cartoonito programming block on Cartoon Network. This was followed by more short cartoons and excerpts from television episodes.

A species of jumping spiders, Salticus lucasi, has been named after this character.

Episodes

YouTube shorts 
YouTube episodes are between nineteen and eighty-five seconds in length.

Following these, three compilation shorts were posted:
All the Songs (March 5, 2021)
Boop (April 16, 2021)
How to be a Friend Like Lucas (May 21, 2021)

In February 2020, it was announced that a Lucas the Spider TV series has secured a global distribution deal with Cartoon Network and Boomerang. It is shown on Cartoon Network's Cartoonito block. A 'first look' cartoon titled "Fun with Findley" was uploaded on YouTube on July 29, 2021. In the following months, this was followed by more new shorts (initially introducing supporting characters from the TV series) and excerpts from the TV show (not mentioned in this table).

Characters 
 Lucas - the Jumping Spider 
 Findley - the Housefly
 Bodhi - the Chameleon
 Avocado - the French Bulldog
 Arlo - the Owl
 Maizie - the Bumblebee
 Dimples - the Goldfish
 Weebiscuit - the Seahorse
 Ant
 Bird
 Moth
 Skunk
 Jump-Jump - the Caterpillar

Television series 

In March 2018, following the purchase of the series by Fresh TV, the company announced to produce a long-form series based on the web series.

In February 2020, Cartoon Network acquired the US broadcast rights to the series for a broadcast in early 2021 on the main channel and on Boomerang., however, the series instead became a launch series for the Cartoonito block, and began airing on the block on September 18, 2021. The series left Cartoonito on September 23, 2022 leaving three episodes unaired in the US, although they aired in Canada. It's left unknown at this point which network will pick up the series in the US next.

Episodes

Ratings

 
}}

References

External links 
 Official Website

2017 web series debuts
2020s Canadian animated television series
2020s Canadian children's television series
2021 Canadian television series debuts
Canadian children's animated comedy television series
Canadian computer-animated television series
Canadian preschool education television series
Animated preschool education television series
2020s preschool education television series
English-language television shows
Television series about spiders
Anthropomorphic arthropods
Fictional spiders
American animated web series
YouTube original programming
Cartoon Network original programming
Cartoonito original programming